Church of St Mary the Virgin is a  Grade I listed church in Salford, Bedfordshire, England.

See also
Grade I listed buildings in Bedfordshire

References

Church of England church buildings in Bedfordshire
Grade I listed churches in Bedfordshire